William Phylip (c.1590-1670) was a Welsh poet and Royalist supporter.

The son of Phylip Sion ap Tomas (died 1625), he was born about 1590. In 1649, on the death of Charles I, he wrote a Welsh elegy on the king, which was printed in the same year. Under the Commonwealth his property at Hendre Fechan, near Barmouth, was confiscated, and he was forced to go into hiding. After an interval he made his peace with the authorities, who made him a collector of taxes. He died at a great age on 11 February 1670, and was buried in Llanddwywe churchyard.

References

Attribution

17th-century Welsh poets
1590s births
1670 deaths